Chelsea is the self-titled debut album by British punk rock band Chelsea. It was recorded during two weeks in early January 1979 and released by Step-Forward Records on 29 June 1979.  In 2008, it was reissued by Captain Oi! with several bonus tracks not included on the original release.

Track listing
 "I'm on Fire" (Geoff Myles) - 3:43
 "Decide" (Gene October) - 3:02
 "Free the Fighters" (Dave Martin)- 3:08
 "Your Toy" (James Stevenson) - 2:56
 "Fools and Soldiers" (Martin) - 3:23
 "All the Downs" (Martin) - 2:34
 "Government" (October) - 5:30
 "Twelve Men" (Martin, Stevenson) - 2:42
 "Many Rivers" (Jimmy Cliff) - 4:33
 "Trouble Is the Day" (Martin) - 3:54

Bonus tracks included on reissue CD:

 "Urban Kids" (Demo) - 2:38
 "No Escape" (Sky Saxon) (Demo) - 2:32
 "Twelve Men" (Demo) - 2:40
 "All the Downs" (Demo) - 2:39

Personnel
Chelsea
Gene October — lead vocals
James Stevenson — lead guitar, backing vocals
Dave Martin — rhythm guitar, backing vocals
Geoff Myles — bass
Chris Bashford — drums, backing vocals
with:
Robin - keyboards
Technical
Alvin Clark, Martin Moss, Nick Smith, Nigel Gray, Pete Hammond - engineer
Tony MacLean - cover photography

References

1979 debut albums
Chelsea (band) albums